Scaeosopha gibbosa is a species of moth of the family Cosmopterigidae. It is found in Brunei.

The wingspan is 16.5–19 mm. The ground colour of the forewings is whitish-yellow, overlaid with brown spots and patches. The hindwings are yellowish-brown.

Etymology
The species name refers to the valvella with a setose process in the male genitalia and is derived from Latin gibbosus (meaning protruding).

References

Moths described in 2012
Scaeosophinae